Tyko is a given name. Notable people with the name include:

Tyko Reinikka (1887–1964), Finnish bank director and politician
Tyko Sallinen (1879–1955), Finnish painter
Tyko Vylka (1886–1960), Nenets painter and author

Masculine given names